Knutstad is a village in Vestvågøy Municipality in Nordland county, Norway.  The village is located on the northeastern part of the island of Vestvågøya, along the European route E10 highway.  Knutstad Chapel is located in the village.

References

Vestvågøy
Villages in Nordland